The rim of a coin is the raised part of the coin that completely encircles the perimeter on both obverse and reverse sides. Not to be confused with the edge of the coin, which is also known as its "third side". 

This is the part which exceeds the area of the die which strikes the coin during production, and as a result is pushed upward and sharpened to form a sort of border around the coin's design. The raised rim reduces wear on the face of the coin.

For accessibility purposes, the rim of the coin is sometimes milled with certain patterns in order for the blind to more easily distinguish between coins. The Australian two dollar coin has periodically distributed around its edge a short set of grooves, which alternate between the smooth rim, whilst the one dollar coin has a larger set of grooves, and the similar-sized ten cent coin has grooves continuously about its edge.

See also

 Milled coinage

References

 

Coins